Pokhara Rhinos is a Nepalese cricket franchise team based in Pokhara, Nepal which plays in the Everest Premier League.

Current squad

Seasons result and standing

References

Everest Premier League
Cricket in Nepal
2017 establishments in Nepal